Leland Merritt Ford (March 8, 1893 – November 27, 1965) was an American businessman and politician who served two terms as a U.S. Representative from California from 1939 to 1943.

Early life and career 
Born in Eureka, Nevada, Ford attended the public schools. He also took various courses at the University of Arizona at Tucson, Virginia Polytechnic Institute at Blacksburg, Sheldon Science of Business, Chicago, Illinois, and the University of California, Los Angeles. He was a surveyor for Southern Sierras Power Co. in 1909 and 1910. Afterward that, he was an employee of the Southern Pacific Railroad in California in 1911 and in New York in 1912 and 1913. He moved to Los Angeles, California, in 1915 and was employed by the Union Pacific Railroad.  He then moved to Lynchburg, Virginia, and engaged in farming and livestock breeding from 1915 to 1919. In 1919, he moved to Santa Monica, California and engaged in the real estate business. He served as a member of the planning commission of Santa Monica, California from 1923 to 1927. Later, he was a county supervisor of Los Angeles County, California from 1936 to 1939.

Congress 
Ford was elected as a Republican to the Seventy-sixth and Seventy-seventh Congresses (January 3, 1939 – January 3, 1943). He was the first congressman to lobby for the mass incarceration of Japanese Americans after the attack on Pearl Harbor brought the U.S. into World War II, and spearheaded the anti-Japanese campaign in California. (Ford initially defended Japanese Americans when Representative John Rankin proposed deporting every "Jap" in the country, but reversed his position after receiving angry letters and telegrams from constituents.)

He was an unsuccessful candidate for reelection in 1942 to the Seventy-eighth Congress.

Later career and death 
He then resumed his real estate business. He was a resident of Pacific Palisades, California. He died in Santa Monica, California, November 27, 1965 and was interred in Woodlawn Cemetery.

References

1893 births
1965 deaths
Los Angeles County Board of Supervisors
University of Arizona alumni
Virginia Tech alumni
Burials at Woodlawn Memorial Cemetery, Santa Monica
Republican Party members of the United States House of Representatives from California
20th-century American politicians
People from Eureka, Nevada